Phillip Joseph Roberto (born January 1, 1949) is a Canadian retired professional ice hockey forward. He played in the National Hockey League (NHL) for the Montreal Canadiens, St. Louis Blues, Detroit Red Wings, Kansas City Scouts, Colorado Rockies and Cleveland Barons between 1969 and 1978. He also played in the World Hockey Association (WHA) for the Birmingham Bulls. He won the Stanley Cup with Montreal in 1971.

Career statistics

Regular season and playoffs

External links

1949 births
Living people
Birmingham Bulls players
Canadian ice hockey forwards
Cleveland Barons (NHL) players
Colorado Rockies (NHL) players
Denver Spurs players
Denver Spurs (WHL) players
Detroit Red Wings players
Ice hockey people from Ontario
Kansas City Scouts players
Montreal Canadiens players
Montreal Voyageurs players
Niagara Falls Flyers (1960–1972) players
St. Louis Blues players
Sportspeople from Niagara Falls, Ontario
Stanley Cup champions